Valiabad or Waliabad may refer to:

Ardabil Province
Valiabad, Ardabil, a village in Meshgin Shahr County

Fars Province
Valiabad, Arsanjan, a village in Arsanjan County
Valiabad, Fasa, a village in Fasa County
Valiabad, Kazerun, a village in Kazerun County

Hamadan Province
Valiabad, Hamadan, a village in Asadabad County

Kerman Province
Valiabad, Arzuiyeh, a village in Arzuiyeh County
Valiabad, Bardsir, a village in Bardsir County
Valiabad, Fahraj, a village in Fahraj County
Valiabad, Shahdad, a village in Kerman County
Valiabad, Rafsanjan, a village in Rafsanjan County

Kermanshah Province
Valiabad, Kermanshah, a village in Kermanshah County
Valiabad, Ravansar, a village in Ravansar County

Khuzestan Province
Valiabad, Behbahan, a village in Behbahan County
Valiabad, Lali, a village in Lali County
Valiabad, Shushtar, a village in Shushtar County

Kohgiluyeh and Boyer-Ahmad Province
Valiabad-e Deli Khomsir, a village in Dana County

Kurdistan Province
Valiabad, Baneh, a village in Baneh County
Valiabad, Qorveh, a village in Qorveh County

Lorestan Province
Valiabad, Lorestan
Valiabad Khosrow Khani, Lorestan
Valiabad-e Cham Puneh, Lorestan
Valiabad-e Shiri, Lorestan

Mazandaran Province
Valiabad, Chalus, a village in Chalus County
Valiabad, Sari, a village in Sari County
Valiabad, Tonekabon, a village in Tonekabon County

North Khorasan Province
Valiabad, Esfarayen, a village in Esfarayen County, North Khorasan Province, Iran
Valiabad, Faruj, a village in Faruj County, North Khorasan Province, Iran

Qazvin Province
Valiabad, Zahray-ye Bala, Qazvin

Razavi Khorasan Province
Valiabad, Razavi Khorasan

Sistan and Baluchestan Province
Valiabad, Iranshahr, a village in Iranshahr County

South Khorasan Province
Valiabad, South Khorasan, a village in Zirkuh County

Tehran Province
Valiabad, Tehran
Valiabad, Qarchak, a village in Qarchak County
Valiabad, Rey, a village in Rey County
Valiabad-e Jazairi, Tehran
Valiabad Rural District, in Qarchak County

West Azerbaijan Province
Valiabad, West Azerbaijan, a village in Miandoab County

Zanjan Province